KINV-LD, virtual and UHF digital channel 14, is a low-powered MeTV-affiliated television station licensed to Billings, Montana. The station is owned by Yellowstone Valley Community Television. The station began broadcasting digitally on October 19, 2009. It was once known as K05HS from 1984 to 1993, broadcasting on VHF channel 5. The station's transmitter is located on Coburn Hill southeast of downtown Billings.

External links

Rabbitears.info query - KINV

MeTV affiliates
Television channels and stations established in 1984
INV-LD
Low-power television stations in the United States